Toad Lake is a lake near the city of Bellingham in the U.S. state of Washington.

Toad Lake was named for fact the lake was the habitat of an abundance of toads.

See also
List of lakes in Washington

References

Lakes of Whatcom County, Washington
Lakes of Washington (state)